The United States state of South Dakota has an official state song, "Hail, South Dakota!", written by DeeCort Hammitt.  The state's largest city, Sioux Falls, is home to the South Dakota Symphony Orchestra.  The town of Vermillion hosts the National Music Museum.

Music Institutions and Venues 

The town of Spearfish is home to the High Plains Heritage Center and Museum, which hosts the National Cowboy Song and Poetry Hall of Fame commemorating cowboy performers like Dale Evans, Roy Rogers, Patsy Montana, Jim Bob Tinsley, and Badger Clark. Rapid City, one of the major cultural centers in the state, hosts the Black Hills Symphony Orchestra.  Other popular musical attractions, such as the Dakota Country Family Music Show and the Mountain Music Show, both near Custer.  Motongator Joe's Country Music Festival-SD is held at the Prairie Village located in Madison South Dakota and is a pure country music festival that has been attracting big crowds to camp and enjoy many of Nashville's country music stars.  The Black Hills Bluegrass Festival is held every year in June and is operated by the Rapid City Arts Council, while the town of Deadwood hosts the WestFest gathering every year as well. The city of Sioux Falls hosts the annual Sioux Falls Jazz and Blues Festival. The Sturgis Motorcycle Rally each summer has had famous bands since 1982, including Jonny Lang from ND.

Notable South Dakota Musicians and Bands

Shawn Colvin, born in Vermillion, famous for the folk rock song "Sunny Came Home" in 1997.
 Judd Hoos, a rock band from Sturgis.
 Indigenous, a Native American blues rock group that came to prominence in the late 1990s with origins in Marty.
Clarence Loomis,  (1889  – 1965) was an American composer, pianist, and teacher, was born in Sioux Falls.
 Boyd Raeburn, jazz bandleader and bass saxophonist, born in Faith.
 Bob Stewart, jazz tuba player, born in Sioux Falls.
 Floyd Red Crow Westerman, country-western artist, born on the Lake Traverse Indian Reservation.
 The Kickback, an indie rock band formed in Vermillion.
 Paradise Fears, alternative band based out of Vermillion.
The Shapeshifterz (band) formed 2018 in Sioux Falls South Dakota (hip-rock) (indie rock) the Shapeshifterz https://g.co/kgs/NZvFcR

See also
Indigenous music of North America#Plains
Sioux music

References

Notes

External links 
"Hail! South Dakota" lyrics and downloadable music
Official page of the South Dakota Symphony
National Music Museum

 
South Dakota